Sarah Gibbins (born 10 June 1970 in Northampton, Northamptonshire, England) is a sport shooter who represented Great Britain at the 2004 Summer Olympics.

At the 2004 Summer Olympics in Athens she participated in the women's trap event, finishing tied for ninth position.

References

1970 births
Living people
Sportspeople from Northampton
British female sport shooters
Trap and double trap shooters
Olympic shooters of Great Britain
Shooters at the 2004 Summer Olympics